La Muelona ("big molar woman"), (also known as Colmillona; "big fang woman") is a character from Colombian mythology, present in the folkloric legends of the populations located in the Andean region (Huila and Tolima) of Colombia.

Characteristics 
The woman is characterized by her teeth that always appear, for which it seems that she always smiles. Her form is as a pretty woman with long hair, penetrating eyes, an extravagant dentition similar to that of a larger animal such as a cow or a horse. Muelona attacks the walkers that appears at the edge of the path as a very attractive and seductive woman, but when they are in her arms, they are crushed by her teeth. According to mythology she is almost always going after gamblers, unfaithful men, and alcoholics. Muelona or Colmillona has a particularity and is that of not attacking men with a home, a pregnant wife or with newborn children. Her favorite time to appear along the roads is between six in the afternoon and eight in the evening. Of Muelona is said she had an extremely high libido.

Origin 
At the time of the Spanish Empire, there was a bad reputation of women who wanted to destroy homes, deceived men and were not very well received by society. One of them, was "La Maga", who had a business of divination of the future. She quickly became famous, and it spread across the plain, she committed countless atrocities. She preferred that young people detest motherhood, quickly left many homes in ruins, because they invested all their fortune in it. When "La Maga" died, the house was filled with a nauseating smell, to the point of having to leave immediately. His house turned dark and in it is hear whispers about her revenge against the players and infidels. After this, the legend came to life and spread rapidly through the villages after the disappearance of several peasants from the surrounding area.

See also 

 Muisca mythology

References

Bibliography 
 

Female legendary creatures
South American mythology
Spanish-language South American legendary creatures
Colombian folklore
Myths and legends of Colombia